In enzymology, a 3,4-dichloroaniline N-malonyltransferase is an enzyme that catalyzes the chemical reaction

malonyl-CoA + 3,4-dichloroaniline  CoA + N-(3,4-dichlorophenyl)-malonamate

Thus, the two substrates of this enzyme are malonyl-CoA and 3,4-dichloroaniline, whereas its two products are CoA and N-(3,4-dichlorophenyl)-malonamate.

This enzyme belongs to the family of transferases, specifically those acyltransferases transferring groups other than aminoacyl groups.  The systematic name of this enzyme class is malonyl-CoA:3,4-dichloroaniline N-malonyltransferase.

References 

 

EC 2.3.1
Enzymes of unknown structure